Lake Yliki ( Yliki, Ancient Greek: Ὑλίκη Hylike, Latinised as Hylica) is a large natural lake of Boeotia, central Greece. Situated 8 km north of Thebes at 78 m elevation, it has been an important source of drinking water for the Athens agglomeration since 1958. It is surrounded by low mountains, which separate it from the drained Lake Copais.

In popular culture
Some scenes of French-singer Indila's music video "S.O.S" were filmed at the lake.

See also
List of lakes in Greece

References

External links

Yliki
Landforms of Boeotia
Landforms of Central Greece